Bindumati Devi (19 July 1918 – 22 July 1978) was a politician from the Indian state of Uttar Pradesh.

She represented Uttar Pradesh State in Rajya Sabha, the Council of States of India parliament from 1967 to 1972. 

She was elected to the Uttar Pradesh Assembly in 1957 and was from Kotwa in Barabanki district. She was married to Dr R. B. Das and had one daughter.

References

1918 births
1978 deaths
Rajya Sabha members from Uttar Pradesh
Uttar Pradesh MLAs 1957–1962
Indian National Congress politicians from Uttar Pradesh